The 2010–11 Quinnipiac Bobcats men's basketball team represented Quinnipiac University in the 2010–11 NCAA Division I men's basketball season. The Bobcats, led by head coach Tom Moore, played their home games at TD Bank Sports Center in Hamden, Connecticut, as members of the Northeast Conference. The Bobcats finished 2nd in the Northeast Conference during the regular season, and were eliminated in the semifinals of the NEC tournament by Robert Morris.

Quinnipiac failed to qualify for the NCAA tournament, but were invited to the 2011 CIT. The Bobcats lost in the first round of the CIT, where they were eliminated by Buffalo, 95–91.

Roster 

Source

Schedule and results

|-
!colspan=9 style=|Regular season

|-
!colspan=9 style=| NEC tournament

|-
!colspan=9 style=| CollegeInsider.com tournament

Source

References

Quinnipiac Bobcats men's basketball seasons
Quinnipiac
Quinnipiac
Quinnipiac men's basketball
Quinnipiac men's basketball